Robert Alexander Burns (April 4, 1905 – August 12, 1995) was a Canadian professional ice hockey left wing who played 19 games in the National Hockey League with the Chicago Black Hawks between 1928 and 1930. Burns spent most of his career, which lasted from 1925 to 1939, in the American Hockey Association (AHA).

Playing career
Burns began his professional career in 1926 with Eddie Livingstone's Chicago Cardinals of the AHA. After the team was forced out of business by the NHL, the AHA assigned his rights to the Chicago Black Hawks. He played one game with the Hawks and the rest of the season for the Duluth Hornets. In 1928–29, he played in seven games for the Black Hawks. He was sent to the Minneapolis Millers the following season but would play in a further twelve games in the NHL for the Black Hawks, scoring his first and only NHL goal. He would play out the rest of his career in the AHA, retiring from pro hockey in 1939.

Career statistics

Regular season and playoffs

External links
 

1905 births
1995 deaths
Canadian expatriate ice hockey players in the United States
Canadian ice hockey left wingers
Chicago Blackhawks players
Chicago Cardinals (ice hockey) players
Chicago Shamrocks players
Duluth Hornets players
Ice hockey people from Ontario
Kansas City Pla-Mors players
Oklahoma City Warriors (ice hockey) players
Ontario Hockey Association Senior A League (1890–1979) players
Owen Sound Greys players
People from Manitoulin Island
St. Louis Flyers (AHA) players